First Choice Holidays Limited (trading as First Choice) is a British online travel agency and tour operator, headquartered in Luton, England. It is a subsidiary of TUI UK, itself a subsidiary of TUI Group, and its holidays are sold in TUI stores and websites. It also operates own brand hotels.

First Choice Holidays previously traded as a subsidiary of First Choice Group plc until its merger with TUI Travel plc in 2007. The company was then revived as a brand in 2011 under the TUI Group brand umbrella.

History

Operations as a Public Limited Company 
The company (originally named Owners Abroad) was founded in 1973 by Neil Scott, a former London taxi driver, ice cream truck operator and movie extra, operating as a travel agent. It first listed on the London Stock Exchange in 1982 with Scott as Chairman and CEO.

In 1987, the group launched Air2000 and in 1990 it acquired Redwing, under the guidance of Howard Klein who had replaced Scott as CEO.

The company renamed as First Choice in 1994.

In July 2005, First Choice Holidays purchased the Europe Express group of companies consisting of multi-channel distribution companies including: go-today.com for direct to consumer vacation packages, E.E.I. Travel and Brian Moore International Tours (BMIT) with travel agent distribution, Travel Services Europe (TSE), the contracting division for hotels and travel services throughout Europe.

Merger with TUI Travel plc
In March 2007, the merger of the travel division of TUI AG with First Choice Group plc was announced. The European Commission approved the merger on 4 June 2007, on the condition that the merged company sell Budget Travel in Ireland. The merged company, TUI Travel PLC, began operations in September 2007.

TUI and First Choice's in-house airlines, Thomsonfly and First Choice Airways, were brought together under the former's Air Operator's Certificate in May 2008, and the merged airline was rebranded as Thomson Airways in November 2008.

In October 2011 it was announced that under a two-year rebranding programme, the store estate would be rebranded as "Thomson featuring First Choice" to create a single travel agency brand; the First Choice branding and uniform will be phased out, and the First Choice name will be used for all-inclusive package holidays sold by the combined network.

The company confirmed in January 2013 that it had received a proposal from its parent to merge. In May 2013, the chief executive of TUI AG ruled out a merger with TUI Travel. In an about-face in June 2014 the two companies announced they had agreed terms on a merger. The merger was completed and TUI Travel was de-listed from the London Stock Exchange on 17 December 2014.

Following the merger, Thomson Airways officially changed its legal name to TUI Airways on 2 October 2017.

Operations

Hotel Brands

References

External links
https://www.firstchoice.co.uk/

Travel and holiday companies of the United Kingdom
Hospitality companies established in 1973
Transport companies established in 1973
British brands
Companies based in Luton
TUI Group
1973 establishments in England